El Jagüel Airport  is a general aviation airport serving Maldonado, Uruguay.

Laguna del Sauce Airport now serves the main international and regional airlines.

The runway pavement still extends south across the Av Aparicio Saravia highway, with only a wire fence across the runway to prevent an overrun from encountering traffic.

See also

Transport in Uruguay
List of airports in Uruguay

References

External links
OpenStreetMap - El Jagüel
OurAirports - El Jagüel Airport

Airports in Uruguay
Buildings and structures in Punta del Este